Detention Adventure is a Canadian children's web series, which premiered May 3, 2019 on CBC Gem. Created by Carmen Albano and Joe Kicak, the series centres on a group of children who stage elaborate pranks every day at school in the hopes of getting detention, so that they can investigate an unconfirmed rumour that the detention room has a secret trap door leading to the laboratory of Alexander Graham Bell.

The series stars Jack Fulton, Alina Prijono, Tomaso Sanelli, Simone Miller and Lilly Bartlam, as well as Andrew Moodie, Benjamin Ayres, Stacey McGunnigle, Sarah McVie, Dan Beirne, Mika Collins, Mike Lobel, Julian Richings, Rodrigo Fernandez-Stoll and Jamie Spilchuk in supporting roles.

In 2020, the series was picked up for distribution in the United States on HBO Max. The series was removed from HBO Max in 2022.

The series received two Canadian Screen Award nominations at the 8th Canadian Screen Awards in 2020, for Best Fiction Web Program or Series and Best Writing in a Web Program or Series (Karen Moore). At the 9th Canadian Screen Awards in 2021, it was nominated for Best Children's or Youth Fiction Program or Series, Best Performance in a Children's or Youth Program or Series (3: Bartlam, Sanelli, Miller), Best Original Music, Fiction (Ari Posner, Amin Bhatia, Sarah Slean and Antonio Naranjo) and Best Writing in a Children's or Youth Program (Jessica Meya).

References

External links

2019 web series debuts
Canadian comedy web series
CBC Gem original programming
2010s Canadian children's television series
2020s Canadian children's television series
Canadian children's web series
Television series about children